Sofular, formerly known as Sorsovi or Borissós, is a village in the Gülağaç District, Aksaray Province, Turkey. Its population is 936 (2021). Before the 2013 reorganisation, it was a town (belde).

References

Villages in Gülağaç District